Daniel Lundby is an American politician from Linn County, Iowa. He represented the 68th district in the Iowa House of Representatives for a single term from 2013 to 2015 as a Democrat.

Early life and career
A fifth generation Iowan, Lundby is the son of Mary Lundby, a Republican who represented Linn County in the legislature from 1987 to 2009. He attended St. Joseph's Catholic Elementary in Marion and Regis High School in Cedar Rapids. He then earned an associate degree from Kirkwood Community College; a Bachelor of Science from Iowa State University (2003) and a master's degree from ISU (2011).

In politics
Lundby ran for the Iowa House in 2012, facing two-term Republican incumbent Nick Wagner. In a very close race, Lundby prevailed by 8,480 votes to Wagner's 8,363. Lundby took office on January 14, 2013. He was defeated for re-election in 2014 by Republican Ken Rizer.

Personal
Lundby is openly gay.

References

Democratic Party members of the Iowa House of Representatives
Living people
LGBT state legislators in Iowa
Gay politicians
People from Marion, Iowa
Iowa State University alumni
Year of birth missing (living people)
21st-century LGBT people